is a railway station in the city of Nagano in Nagano Prefecture, Japan. The station is operated by East Japan Railway Company (JR East) and the private railway operator Nagano Electric Railway (Nagaden).

Lines
Nagano Station is served by the following lines.
JR East
Hokuriku Shinkansen (branded "Nagano Shinkansen" until March 2015), on which it is 222.4 kilometers from Tokyo Station
Shinetsu Main Line
Shinonoi Line
Iiyama Line
 Shinano Railway Line
Nagano Electric Railway Nagano Line

Station layout 
The JR East portion of the station has two elevated island platforms for the Shinkansen services, and three ground-level island platforms for local services, including onward services by Kita-Shinano Line trains. 
The station has a "Midori no Madoguchi" staffed ticket office.

JR East

The Shinkansen platforms use the tune "Shinano no Kuni" (the Nagano prefectural song) for the departure melody since January 2015.

Nagano Electric Railway 
The Nagano Electric Railway platforms are located underground below the JR platforms. The Nagano Electric Railway has two island platforms serving three tracks.

History
Nagano Station opened on 1 May 1888. When the Japanese National Railways (JNR) were divided and privatized on 1 April 1987, the station became a part of the system of East Japan Railway Company (JR East). On 1 October 1997, JR East opened the Nagano Shinkansen with its terminus at Nagano.

Bus terminals

Highway buses 
 For Nerima Station, Nakano-sakaue Station, and Shinjuku Station
 For Nerima Station,  Shimo-Ochiai Station, and Ikebukuro Station
 For Keisei Ueno Station, Asakusa, Tokyo Disney Resort, Nishi-Funabashi Station, and Narita International Airport
 For Sakudaira Station, Iwamurada Station, and Usuda
 For Matsumoto Bus Terminal (Matsumoto Station)
 For Hakuba-Goryu, Hakuba Station, Hakuba Happo, Tsugaike Kogen, and Hakuba-Norikura
 For Shinano-Ōmachi Station and Ōgizawa Station
 Misuzu Highway Bus; For Matsumoto, Okaya, Ina, Komagane, and  Iida Station
 Seseragi; For Kamikōchi
 For Nigata Station
 For Kurobe,, Uozu, Namerikawa, and Toyama Station
 Chuodo Kosoku Bus; For Tokadai, Sakae, and Nagoya Station
 Alpen Nagano; For Kyōto Station, Senri-Chūō Station, Momoyamadai Station, Shin-Ōsaka Station, and Umeda Station
 Southern Cross; For Kyoto Station, Ōsaka Station, JR Namba Station(OCAT), Namba Station, and Sannomiya Station

Passenger statistics
In fiscal 2015, the JR East portion of the station was used by an average of 21,168 passengers daily (boarding passengers only).

References

External links

 Nagano Station (JR East)

Railway stations in Nagano Prefecture
Railway stations in Nagano (city)
Shin'etsu Main Line
Stations of East Japan Railway Company
Nagano Electric Railway
Hokuriku Shinkansen
Railway stations in Japan opened in 1888